Ore Jatri is a Bengali drama film directed by Rajen Choudhury and director of photography Anil Gupta. It was released on 1 January 1951 in the banner of Kalpa Chitramandir production company. The film has Uttam Kumar and Prabha Devi in the lead roles. It was filmed in black and white.

Cast
 Prabha Devi
 Uttam Kumar
 Anubha Gupta
 Dhirendranath Ganguly
 Dipak Mukhopadhyay
 Nabadwip Halder
 Namita Ray
 Nitai Bhattacharya
 Renuka Ray
 Tara Bhaduri

References

External links
 

1951 films
Bengali-language Indian films
1951 drama films
1950s Bengali-language films
Indian drama films